Lost & Profound is a Canadian folk rock band that originated in the early 1990s. They are known for their moody, low-key folk songs.

History

Originally from Calgary, Alberta, the group began performing under the name The Psychedelic Folk Virgins. The band consisted of vocalist Lisa Boudreau and guitarist Terry Tompkins, with a varying roster of supporting musicians that included Anton Evans on bass, Vic D'Arsie on keyboards, and Curtis Driedger, Allen Baekeland and David Quinton-Steinberg on drums.

After moving to Toronto in 1985, the band released the independent cassette The Bottled Romance of Nowhere and signed a recording contract with A&R's PolyGram Records.

Boudreau and Tompkins, a married couple, signed as Lost & Profound to PolyGram in 1992, and released their self-titled debut produced by Richard Bennett. The album included a Top 20 hit single "Brand New Set of Lies". Other singles from the album included "Curb the Angels" and "Winter Raging". They garnered a Juno Award nomination for Most Promising Group at the 1993 Juno Awards.

The band followed up with Memory Thief released on PolyGram Records in 1994, which spawned the singles "Miracles Happen" and "Invitation". Memory Thief was also produced by Richard Bennett and featured musicians Jamie Stewart (bass), Kenny Greenberg (guitar), and Michael Organ (drums). Boudreau and Tompkins recorded a faithful recreation of "Some Velvet Morning", the 1967 psychedelic duet by Nancy Sinatra and Lee Hazlewood for inclusion on Memory Thief. Producer Bennett brought in arranger Billy Strange to conduct his original orchestral score from the 1967 Sinatra/Hazlewood session.

Love's Sweet Messenger was released independently in 1996. Boudreau and Tompkins subsequently pursued different directions.

After a prolonged break, Boudreau and Tompkins reunited as Lost & Profound in 2015, co-producing and releasing a new album Goodbye Mine.

Discography

The Psychedelic Folk Virgins
1989:  The Bottled Romance of Nowhere
1990:  The Psychedelic Folk Virgins

Lost & Profound
1992:  Lost & Profound (Polydor/PolyGram) 5132512
1994:  Memory Thief (Polydor/PolyGram) 5195182
1996:  Love's Sweet Messenger
2015:  Goodbye Mine (Drunk Boat Records)

Red Suede Red
2002:  Red Suede Red

References

External links
 

Musical groups established in 1989
Musical groups disestablished in 2002
1991 in Canadian music
Musical groups from Toronto
Canadian folk rock groups
1989 establishments in Alberta
2002 disestablishments in Ontario